Pilot Branch (also called Pilot Creek) is a stream in Moniteau County in the U.S. state of Missouri. It is a tributary of Smith Creek.

Pilot Branch was named for a nearby tract of trees which stood as a point of navigation to pioneers.

References

Rivers of Moniteau County, Missouri
Rivers of Missouri